†Perdicella maniensis was a species of tropical air-breathing land snail, a terrestrial pulmonate gastropod mollusk in the family Achatinellidae. This species  was endemic to Hawaii in the United States.

References

m
Molluscs of Hawaii
Extinct gastropods
Extinct Hawaiian animals
Taxonomy articles created by Polbot